"No Heart" is a song recorded by Atlanta-based rapper 21 Savage and American record producer Metro Boomin. It was released on October 19, 2016, by Epic Records and serves as the second single from their collaborative extended play Savage Mode. The song was certified Platinum by the Recording Industry Association of America (RIAA).

Background and release
This song was originally released on July 15, 2016 off of their debut EP Savage Mode. Metro Boomin hinted at the track on Twitter a week before Savage Mode's release date. It was then released as a single on October 19, 2016.

Music video
The song's accompanying music video premiered on October 18, 2016 on 21 Savage's account on YouTube. The video reenacts the store scene from the film Menace II Society.

Charts

Weekly charts

Year-end charts

Certifications

Release history

References

External links
Lyrics of this song at Genius

2016 singles
2016 songs
21 Savage songs
Metro Boomin songs
Songs written by Metro Boomin
Song recordings produced by Metro Boomin
Songs written by Southside (record producer)
Song recordings produced by Cubeatz
Songs written by Kevin Gomringer
Songs written by Tim Gomringer
Songs written by 21 Savage
Epic Records singles
Trap music songs
Gangsta rap songs
Hardcore hip hop songs